Vern May (born December 31, 1975) better known by his ringname Vance Nevada is a Canadian professional wrestler, author, professional wrestling promoter and wrestling historian.

Professional wrestling career
Since his earliest matches in 1993, Vance Nevada has maintained one of the most aggressive touring schedules of his generation, appearing for 64 wrestling organizations from coast to coast in Canada and wrestling in almost every Province and territory in the country during his career. His passion for the sport and his exposure to the regional sub-cultures of professional wrestling and its fans have served to create an immeasurable appreciation for the sport and its history.

In addition to his success between the ropes which has included matches against ring legends and today’s top stars from Jim Neidhart, Matt Borne and the Honky Tonk Man to Kenny Omega, Kyle O'Reilly and the Bollywood Boyz, Vance Nevada is regarded as one of the premiere historians of Canadian ring lore, having published three books on the top and being awarded with the James C. Melby Historian Award by the U.S.-based Cauliflower Alley Club for his efforts.

Aside from his endeavours to preserve wrestling’s past, while also actively participating in wrestling’s present, Nevada is a life member of the Cauliflower Alley Club, a benevolent organization of wrestling professionals that provides funding and resource support for wrestling’s alumni in the face of medical and personal hardship. In addition to his role on the advisory board and committee appointments, he has served as the editor for the club’s international newsletter since 2020.

Between 1994 and 2009, Nevada was ranked in the Pro Wrestling Illustrated magazine top 500 ten times. In February 2022, he eclipsed the all-time record set by Leo Burke for most Canadian wrestling title reigns at 44. 

Nevada has done four Canadian Death Tours.

Personal life

Championships and accomplishments
All-Star Wrestling
ASW Trans Canada Heavyweight Championship (5 times)
Canadian Wrestling Federation
CWF Junior Heavyweight Championship
CWF Tag Team Championship (5 times)
Elite Canadian Championship Wrestling
ECCW Championship
National Wrestling Alliance
NWA Canadian Heavyweight Championship
River City Wrestling
RCW Can-Am Team Challenge Trophy Championship
RCW Hardcore Championship
RCW Junior Heavyweight Championship
RCW Tag Team Championship (4 times)
Top Rope Championship Wrestling
TRCW International Heavyweight Championship
TRCW Tag Team Championship (3 times)
Top Ranked Wrestling
TRW Tag Team Championship
Wild West Wrestling/Hardcore Wrestling
WWW Tag Team Championship (2 times)
Pro Wrestling Illustrated
PWI ranked him #224 of the 500 best singles wrestlers in the PWI 500 in 2005
 Canadian Wrestling's Elite
 CWE Hall of Fame (class of 2015)
 Canadian Wrestling Hall of Fame
 Class of 2016
Cauliflower Alley Club
James Melby Historian Award (2010)
Other
Canadian Unified Junior Heavyweight Championship

Luchas de Apuestas record

Works

"(Un)Controlled Chaos: Canada's Remarkable Professional Wrestling Legacy" (2022, Friesen Press)

The Ear, Cauliflower Alley Club newsletter - editor (2020-2022)

CNWA Magazine - lead writer/publisher (2012-2013, nine issues)

History of Professional Wrestling Series #5 - researcher (2002, Crowbar Press)

 Wrestling in the Canadian West

Central Canadian Professional Wrestling Almanac (1999, self-published)

References

External links
 Vance Nevada story archive at Canoe.com
 Archive of articles by Nevada on ontariowrestlingsindyelite.com
 
 

1975 births
Living people
Canadian male professional wrestlers
Professional wrestling journalists and columnists
Professional wrestling historians
20th-century professional wrestlers
21st-century professional wrestlers
NWA Canadian Heavyweight Champions